FK Metta (also  called FK Metta/Latvijas Universitāte from 2007 till the end of 2018 season) is a professional Latvian football club in Riga. As of 2012 they play in the Latvian Higher League. Metta play their home games at Daugava Stadium. Until June 2018, their home venue was the Riga Hanza Secondary School Stadium.

History

FS Metta was officially founded on May 2, 2006, though the club had been active in youth tournaments since 2000. In 2007 FS Metta and University of Latvia (Latvijas Universitāte) merged as a senior professional team and participated in the Latvian Championship first division (Traffic 1. līga). They finished the season in the fourth position. The club remained at the same level for the next four seasons. Though a professional club, Metta retained the prefix FS (Futbola Skola), since their policy was to invest in youth players. In 2011 Metta won the Latvian First League championship and were automatically promoted to the Latvian Higher League – the top tier of Latvian football.

The affiliation with the university provides the club with a greater financial backing and the players with the opportunity, if wanted, to study at the most prestigious Latvian University. The club was created with the aim to gather the greatest youth talents from across the country and surrounding areas to build and shape them into expensive players for sale to bigger clubs.

In 2020 FK Metta were the youngest top-tier team in Europe. At the end of the season, the team's average age was 19,5.

In September 2020, FK Metta forward Raimonds Krollis made his debut for the Latvia national football team. He became the first-ever player that has gone through the whole FK Metta academy and played for the Senior national team.

Patron of the University of Latvia 
Football school "Metta" is a silver patron of the University of Latvia Foundation. They have supported the University of Latvia since 2016, donating to the football system and scholarships.

Participation in Latvian Championships

Honours
 Latvian First League champions (1)
 2011

Managers
 Andris Riherts (02.05.2006 – 09.06.2021)
 Andrejs Gluščuks (11.06.2021 – present)

Current players

First-team squad
As of 11 March, 2023

Player of the year

Club officials

Board of Directors

 General secretary: Ģirts Mihelsons
 Executive Director: Maira Mihelsone

Coaching staff
 Manager: Andrejs Gluščuks
 Coach: Andrejs Karpovs
 Coach: Viktors Mazurs
 Fitness Coach: Jānis Skābardis
 Second team coach: Jānis Goba
 Goalkeeping Coach: Artūrs Biezais

Medical staff
 Physiotherapist: Sergejs Davidovičs
 Physiotherapist: Ēriks Čuhnovs

Staff
 Press Officer: Miks Vilkaplāters
 PR manager: Rihards Krēvics
 Technical manager: Harijs Toms

Shirt sponsors and manufacturers

References

External links
  Official website
  FS Metta University of Latvia
  Official Latvian Football Federation website

 
Football clubs in Riga
Association football clubs established in 2006
2006 establishments in Latvia